The Lincoln Elementary School  (also known as Pittsburgh Lincoln K-8) located in the Larimer neighborhood of Pittsburgh, Pennsylvania is a building from 1931. It was listed on the National Register of Historic Places in 1986.

The historical marker near the front of the building on Frankstown Avenue says the following:

References

External links
Lincoln PreK-5

School buildings on the National Register of Historic Places in Pennsylvania
Art Deco architecture in Pennsylvania
School buildings completed in 1931
Schools in Pittsburgh
Defunct schools in Pennsylvania
City of Pittsburgh historic designations
Pittsburgh History & Landmarks Foundation Historic Landmarks
1931 establishments in Pennsylvania
National Register of Historic Places in Pittsburgh